The episodes of the 2007 anime television series Blue Drop are based on the manga of the same name written by Akihito Yoshitomi, constituting a prequel to the manga. The episodes are directed by Masahiko Ohkura and animated by the Japanese animation studios Asahi Production and BeSTACK, with the 3D modeling done by Gonzo. The plot of the episodes follows Mari Wakatake's relationship with the enigmatic Hagino Senkōji, a member of an alien race known as the Arume, and the prelude to an invasion by the Arume.

The episodes aired from October 2, 2007 to December 25, 2007 on  Chiba TV and KBS Kyoto, with AT-X, Mie TV, Tokyo MX TV, TV Kanagawa, TV Saitama, and TV Wakayama showing the episodes at later dates. The AT-X broadcast started much later than its counterparts, with the first episode airing in November, while most other stations started showing the episodes in October. Unlike most Japanese anime, the title of each episode is given in English. Each title is the name of a flower shown in that episode.

Two pieces of theme music are used for the episodes; one opening theme and one ending theme. The opening theme is "BLUE" by Japanese singer Suara, and another of her songs,  is used as the closing theme. A single containing both songs was released on October 24, 2007.

Six DVD compilations have been planned for release by King Records, and the first compilation, composing the first three episodes of the anime, was released on December 26, 2007. D The second compilation, which contains the next two episodes of the anime, was released on January 23, 2008.

The anime has been licensed for release in North America by Sentai Filmworks and is distributed by Section23 Films. The subtitled complete collection was released on November 17, 2009. Sentai Filmworks and Section23 Films re-released the complete series with an English dub on September 7, 2010.

Episode list

Notes

References
General

Specific

External links
Official website 

Blue Drop: Tenshitachi no Gikyoku